Vera Maria Hagemann (7 April 1923 – 24 December 2012) was a Swiss Olympic fencer. She competed in the women's individual foil event at the 1948 Summer Olympics.

References

External links
 

1927 births
2012 deaths
Swiss female foil fencers
Olympic fencers of Switzerland
Fencers at the 1948 Summer Olympics